Río Negro (literally Black River) is a 1977 Cuban documentary film directed by Manuel Pérez. It was entered into the 10th Moscow International Film Festival where it won the Special Prize.

Cast
 Mario Balmaseda
 Sergio Corrieri
 René de la Cruz
 Alejandro Lugo
 Raúl Pomares
 Nelson Villagra

See also 
 List of Cuban films

References

External links
 

1977 films
1977 documentary films
Cuban documentary films
1970s Spanish-language films